The UK Singles Chart is one of many music charts compiled by the Official Charts Company that calculates the best-selling singles of the week in the United Kingdom. Before 2004, the chart was only based on the sales of physical singles. This list shows singles that peaked in the Top 10 of the UK Singles Chart during 1983, as well as singles which peaked in 1982 and 1984 but were in the top 10 in 1983. The entry date is when the single appeared in the top 10 for the first time (week ending, as published by the Official Charts Company, which is six days after the chart is announced).

One-hundred and forty-nine singles were in the top ten in 1983. Ten singles from 1982 remained in the top 10 for several weeks at the beginning of the year, while "Islands in the Stream" by Kenny Rogers & Dolly Parton, "Marguerita Time" by Status Quo and "Tell Her About It" by Billy Joel were all released in 1983 but did not reach their peak until 1984. "A Winter's Tale" by David Essex, "Best Years of Our Lives" by Modern Romance and "You Can't Hurry Love" by Phil Collins were the singles from 1982 to reach their peak in 1983. Thirty-three artists scored multiple entries in the top 10 in 1983. Billy Joel, The Cure, Eurythmics, Paul Young and U2 were among the many artists who achieved their first UK charting top 10 single in 1983.

The 1982 Christmas number-one, "Save Your Love" by Renée and Renato remained at number-one for the first two weeks of 1983. The first new number-one single of the year was "You Can't Hurry Love" by Phil Collins of Genesis. Overall, eighteen different singles peaked at number-one in 1983, with eighteen unique artists having singles hitting that position.

Background

Multiple entries
One-hundred and forty-nine singles charted in the top 10 in 1983, with one-hundred and thirty-nine singles reaching their peak this year.

Thirty-three artists scored multiple entries in the top 10 in 1983. Michael Jackson secured the record for most top 10 hits in 1983 with five hit singles.

Billy Joel was one of a number of artists with two top-ten entries, including the number-one single "Uptown Girl". Bananarama, David Essex, Heaven 17, Lionel Richie and The Police were among the other artists who had multiple top 10 entries in 1983.

Chart debuts
Forty-eight artists achieved their first top 10 single in 1983, either as a lead or featured artist. Of these, seven went on to record another hit single that year: Big Country, Billy Joel, Heaven 17, JoBoxers, Malcolm McLaren, The Style Council and Thompson Twins. Three artists achieved two more chart hits in 1983: Kajagoogoo, Paul Young and Tracey Ullman. Eurythmics had three other entries in their breakthrough year.

The following table (collapsed on desktop site) does not include acts who had previously charted as part of a group and secured their first top 10 solo single.

Notes
Phil Everly achieved his first solo top ten single in 1983, his collaboration with Cliff Richard, "She Means Nothing to Me", landing at number nine. With his brother Don, the Everly Brothers had 13 top ten hits between 1957 and 1965. Tom Robinson fronted the Tom Robinson Band from 1976 to 1979, with their biggest hit "2-4-6-8 Motorway" reaching number 5. "War Baby" became his first and only solo top 10 single. Tina Turner's previous recordings were all with her husband Ike under the name Ike & Tina Turner, debuting with the number 3 hit "River Deep Mountain High" in 1966. "Let's Stay Together" marked her first time in the top ten by herself.

Songs from films
Original songs from various films entered the top 10 throughout the year. These included "Up Where We Belong" (An Officer and a Gentleman) and "Flashdance... What a Feeling" (Flashdance).

Best-selling singles
Culture Club had the best-selling single of the year with "Karma Chameleon". The single spent ten weeks in the top 10 (including six weeks at number one) and sold over 1.39 million copies and was certified platinum by the BPI. "Uptown Girl" by Billy Joel came in second place, selling more than 949,000 copies and losing out by around 390,000 sales. UB40's "Red Red Wine", "Let's Dance" from David Bowie and "Total Eclipse of the Heart" by Bonnie Tyler made up the top five. Singles by Spandau Ballet, Men at Work, Michael Jackson, The Flying Pickets and Lionel Richie were also in the top ten best-selling singles of the year.

Top-ten singles

Entries by artist

The following table shows artists who achieved two or more top 10 entries in 1983, including singles that reached their peak in 1982 or 1984. The figures include both main artists and featured artists, while appearances on ensemble charity records are also counted for each artist. The total number of weeks an artist spent in the top ten in 1983 is also shown.

Notes

 "Tell Her About It" reached its peak of number four on 14 January 1984 (week ending).
 "The Crown" is one of the longest songs to ever chart on the UK Singles Chart, with the 12" version having a running time of 10 minutes 35 seconds.
 "Say Say Say" re-entered the top 10 at number 3 on 12 November 1983 (week ending) for four weeks.
 Figure includes single that peaked in 1982.
 Figure includes single that first charted in 1982 but peaked in 1983.
 Figure includes single that peaked in 1984.
 Figure includes a top 10 hit with the group Genesis.

See also
1983 in British music
List of number-one singles from the 1980s (UK)

References
General

Specific

External links
1983 singles chart archive at the Official Charts Company (click on relevant week)
The Official Top 50 best-selling songs of 1983 at the Official Charts Company

United Kingdom
Top 10 singles
1983